General Sir Henry Buckley Burton Watkis  (4 June 1860 – 5 May 1931) was a general in the Indian Army.

References

External links
 IBD Wikisource
 Find a Grave – memorial

British Indian Army generals
Knights Companion of the Order of the Bath
1860 births
1931 deaths
Military personnel from Shrewsbury